Sommerfeldtbukta is a bay in Sørkapp Land at Spitsbergen, Svalbard. It has a length of about 8.5 kilometers, is located east of Øyrlandet and Øyrlandsodden, and extends further from Skjerodden via Stjernøya and Skolteneset to Sørneset. The bay is  named after Norwegian botanist Søren Christian Sommerfeldt.

References

Bays of Spitsbergen